Strathisla distillery  is the oldest continuously operating distillery in the Scottish Highlands.

History

It was founded as the Milltown Distillery by George Taylor and Alexander Milne in 1786 as an alternative to the waning of the flax dressing industry. They leased the land from the Earl of Seafield. By 1830, the distillery was owned by William Longmore, later William Longmore Ltd. In 1879, the distillery suffered terribly from a fire, but was rebuilt with a bottling plant. Bought in 1940 by Jay Pomeroy, a fraudulent financier, it was later acquired in 1950 by James Barclay of Chivas Bros.

Scotland's Malt Whisky Trail is a tourism initiative featuring seven working Speyside distilleries including Strathisla, a historic distillery (Dallas Dhu, now a museum) and the Speyside Cooperage.  According to a BBC article, visitors can tour the "traditional warehouse where the single malts that make up the premium and super premium blends are stored ... [and try the] distinctive mellow honey flavour, offering a full, nutty, balanced whisky".

See also
 List of distilleries in Scotland
 List of historic whisky distilleries

References

Further reading

 

Distilleries in Scotland
Scottish malt whisky
Listed distilleries in Scotland
1786 establishments in Scotland
Category A listed buildings in Moray
Companies based in Moray
Food and drink companies established in 1786
Keith, Moray
Pernod Ricard brands